Loris James "Horse" Hagerty (April 16, 1905 – March 26, 1991) was an American football player.

A native of Blanchard, Iowa, Hagerty attended the University of Iowa where he played football and competed in track. At Iowa, he played in the backfield with Willis Glassgow.

Hagerty later played professional football in the National Football League (NFL) as a fullback for the Brooklyn Dodgers. He appeared in nine NFL games during the 1930 season, two as a starter.

References

1905 births
1991 deaths
Iowa Hawkeyes football players
Brooklyn Dodgers (NFL) players
Players of American football from Iowa